The Canton of Saint-Saëns is a former canton situated in the Seine-Maritime département and in the Haute-Normandie region of northern France. It was disbanded following the French canton reorganisation which came into effect in March 2015. It consisted of 15 communes, which joined the canton of Neufchâtel-en-Bray in 2015. It had a total of 8,927 inhabitants (2012).

Geography 
An area of farming and associated light industry in the arrondissement of Dieppe, centred on the town of Saint-Saëns. The altitude varies from 90m (Saint-Saëns) to 236m (Sommery) for an average altitude of 164m.

The canton comprised 15 communes:

Bosc-Bérenger
Bosc-Mesnil
Bradiancourt
Critot
Fontaine-en-Bray
Mathonville
Maucomble
Montérolier
Neufbosc
Rocquemont
Sainte-Geneviève
Saint-Martin-Osmonville
Saint-Saëns
Sommery
Ventes-Saint-Rémy

Population

See also 
 Arrondissements of the Seine-Maritime department
 Cantons of the Seine-Maritime department
 Communes of the Seine-Maritime department

References

Saint-Saens
2015 disestablishments in France
States and territories disestablished in 2015